Anderson Santos da Vitória (born 10 June 1992), simply known as Anderson, is a Brazilian footballer who plays for Sergipe as a left back.

Club career

Born in Rio de Janeiro, Anderson was a Flamengo youth graduate. In 2011, after failing to reach an agreement for his contract renewal, he left the club and joined Vitesse Arnhem in the Netherlands.

Anderson's spell at Vitesse was mainly associated with the reserve team, as he failed to make a single first team appearance during his two years at the club. On 27 December 2013 he returned to Brazil, after agreeing to a contract with Botafogo.

Anderson only appeared rarely for Bota in 2014 Campeonato Carioca, being omitted from the first team during the year's Série A. The following year, he moved to Tombense.

Anderson was subsequently loaned to Sampaio Corrêa midway through the campaign. After being sparingly used, he joined Portuguesa.

References

External links

1992 births
Living people
Footballers from Rio de Janeiro (city)
Brazilian footballers
Association football defenders
Campeonato Brasileiro Série B players
Campeonato Brasileiro Série C players
Botafogo de Futebol e Regatas players
Tombense Futebol Clube players
Sampaio Corrêa Futebol Clube players
Associação Portuguesa de Desportos players
Associação Atlética Caldense players
SBV Vitesse players
Esporte Clube XV de Novembro (Piracicaba) players
Tupynambás Futebol Clube players
Cianorte Futebol Clube players
Club Sportivo Sergipe players
Brazilian expatriate footballers
Brazilian expatriate sportspeople in the Netherlands
Expatriate footballers in the Netherlands